On 20 November 1992, a fire broke out in Windsor Castle, the largest inhabited castle in the world and one of the official residences of the British Monarch. The castle suffered extensive damage and was fully repaired within the next five years at a cost of £36.5 million, in a project led by the conservation architects Donald Insall Associates. It led to Queen Elizabeth II paying tax on her income, and to Buckingham Palace, the former monarch's other official residence, being opened to the public to help pay for the restoration work. This event was part of what Queen Elizabeth II called her annus horribilis.

Timeline of the fire

Early stages

The fire began in the Queen's Private Chapel at 11:15am when a curtain was ignited by a spotlight pressed up against it. Agents of the Royal Household were in the chapel at the time inspecting works of art. A fire alarm went off in the watch room of the castle fire brigade, manned by the Chief Fire Officer, Marshall Smith. The fire's location was shown by a light on a grid-map of the castle. Initially, the Brunswick Tower was lit up, but lights soon began to flash indicating that the fire had spread quickly to neighbouring rooms.

A major part of the State Apartments was soon ablaze. Building contractors working in a nearby room attempted to subdue the blaze with fire extinguishers. The  curtains eventually dropped to the floor and continued to burn, while those present hurriedly began removing paintings from the chapel, until the intense heat and raining embers forced them to leave at 11:32am.

At 11:36am, Smith pressed a switch to alert the control room at Reading fire station. He then activated the castle's public fire alarm and telephoned the Royal Berkshire Fire and Rescue Service on a direct line, giving the message, "Windsor Castle here; we have got a fire in the Private Chapel. Come to the Quadrangle as arranged".

The castle still had its own twenty-person fire brigade, of whom six were full-time. Equipped with a Land Rover and pump tender, they were based in stables two miles south of the castle, and arrived on the scene at 11:41am. Appliances from the Fire and Rescue Service arrived at 11:44am. By 11:56am, 17 pumping appliances had been ordered. An operation to save furniture and works of art involving castle staff, building contractors and the Queen's son, Prince Andrew, had commenced in rooms adjacent to the fire.

Subsequent events
By 12:12pm, there were 20 fire engines, and by 12:20pm there were 35. Over 200 fire-fighters had come from London, Buckinghamshire, Surrey, and Oxfordshire, as well as from Berkshire. The Fire Incident Commander was David Harper, Deputy Chief Fire and Rescue Officer of the Fire and Rescue Service. The Chief Officer, Garth Scotford, was out of the country, on holiday.

By 12:20pm, the fire had spread to St George's Hall, a banqueting hall and the largest of the State Apartments. The number of fire appliances now totalled 39 with 225 fire-fighters in attendance. Hoses were directed at all levels of the building surrounding the fire. As an indication of the fire's scale, there had been just one 30-appliance fire in the whole of Greater London since 1973.

By 1:30pm, tradesmen had created fire breaks at the southern wall of the Green Drawing Room (at the end of St George's Hall on the east side of the Quadrangle) and at the northwest corner at Chester Tower, where joins the Grand Corridor. The fire-fighters had by this time started to bring the fire under control, though the roof of the State Apartments had begun to collapse.

At 3:30pm, the floors of the Brunswick Tower collapsed. Firemen had to temporarily withdraw to locate three men who were briefly lost in the smoke, and withdrew again because men were temporarily unaccounted for when part of the roof collapsed.

At 4:15pm, the fire had revived in the Brunswick Tower.

At 7:00pm, the roof of St George's Hall finally collapsed.

By 8:00pm, after burning for nine hours, the fire was under control. It continued to burn for another three hours.

By 11:00pm, the main fire was extinguished, and by 2:30am, the last secondary fires were extinguished. Pockets of fire remained until the early hours of the morning, some 15 hours after it began. 60 firemen with eight appliances remained on duty for several more days. The fire had spread rapidly due to the large cavities and voids in the roof. 1.5 million gallons (7 million litres) of water from the mains water supply, a reservoir-fed hydrant, a swimming pool, a pond, and the nearby River Thames were used to fight it.

Salvage operation
It was an enormous operation: 300 clocks, a collection of miniatures, thousands of valuable books and historic manuscripts, and old Master drawings from the Royal Library were saved. On fire officers' instructions, heavy chests and tables were left behind. All other items were placed on giant sheets of tarpaulin in the North Terrace and Quadrangle, and the police called in dozens of removal vans from a large part of the home counties to transport items to other parts of the castle.

Members of the Royal Household, including the 13th Earl of Airlie, assisted in the operation. The Royal Collection Department were especially active, including the director, Sir Geoffrey de Bellaigue; the surveyor of pictures, Christopher Lloyd; the deputy surveyor of the Queen's works of art, Hugh Roberts; the curator of Print Room, Mrs Roberts; and the librarian, Oliver Everett. The Household Cavalry arrived from nearby Combermere Barracks. Some 100 officers and men of the Life Guards proved invaluable for moving bulky items. In all, 125 castle staff, 125 contractors, 100 military personnel and 20 Crown Estate staff were involved in the salvage operation.

There had been no serious injuries and no deaths. Dean Lansdale, a decorator in the Private Chapel, burnt his hands while removing the three or four pictures he rescued. He was moved to the royal surgery and then to a hospital. A royal spokesman denied reports in the media that the surveyor of the Queen's pictures had suffered a heart attack. Five firemen were taken to hospital with minor injuries.

Extent of damage to the castle

Structural damage
The major loss was to the fabric of the castle. The false ceiling in St George's Hall and the void for coal trucks beneath the floor had allowed the fire to spread. It burned as far as the Chester Tower. Several ceilings collapsed. Apartments burnt included the Crimson Drawing Room (completely gutted), the Green Drawing Room (badly damaged, though only partially destroyed by smoke and water) and the Queen's Private Chapel (including the double-sided 19th century Henry Willis organ in the gallery between St George's Hall and Private Chapel, oak panelling, glass and the altar).

St George's Hall survived with the walls largely intact, but the ceiling had collapsed. The State Dining Room in the Prince of Wales Tower and the Grand Reception Room were also devastated. In total, 100 rooms were affected by the fire. Smaller apartments damaged or destroyed included the Star Chamber, Octagon Room, Brunswick Tower (covered in 12 feet (3.5 m) of debris), Cornwall Tower, Prince of Wales Tower, Chester Tower, Holbein Room and the Great Kitchen, which lost its plaster coving and most of the medieval timber. The external wall above the bay window of the Crimson Drawing Room (between the Prince of Wales and Chester Towers) was seriously calcified.

Contents

The most seriously damaged rooms had largely been emptied of their valuable contents the previous day, and some paintings were on loan to a travelling exhibition. Peter Brooke, then Secretary of State for National Heritage, called the fire a national disaster.

Tourism
Tourists were allowed into the precincts within three days. The Queen was back in residence a fortnight later. The Gallery and Queen Mary's Dolls' House reopened in December. The State Apartments reopened in 1993 after rewiring was completed, with all major rooms open by Easter, when only St George's Hall and the Grand Reception Room stayed closed. Thus eleven of fifteen principal rooms of the State Apartments were open, and two were still undergoing long-term restoration, with two more having been destroyed.

Restoration project

Funding
It was initially feared that it would cost £60 million to restore the castle, though the final cost was £36.5 million (equivalent to £ million in ), and that drying out the castle would take 10 years. Occupied royal palaces like Windsor Castle are too valuable to insure, and items in the Royal Collection are not insured against loss. An independent trust for private donations towards the cost of the restoration was announced on 16 February 1993 by the Queen's bank, Coutts. On 29 April 1993 it was announced that 70% of the cost would be met by charging the public for entry into the castle precincts and £8 for admission to Buckingham Palace for the next five years. The Queen contributed £2 million of her own money, and she agreed to start paying income tax from 1993 onwards, making her the first British monarch to do so since the 1930s.

Planning

On 7 June 1994, details of the restoration project were announced. The architectural firm Donald Insall Associates was appointed by the Royal Household to take overall charge of the restoration, with Sidell Gibson dealing with the reconstruction of St George's Hall and the design of the new Lantern Lobby and Private Chapel. Over half the damaged and destroyed rooms, including the State and Octagon dining rooms, were to be restored as original. There were to be new designs for the St George's Hall ceiling (with steel reinforcing beams in the roof) and East Screen, as well as the Queen's Private Chapel and the Stuart and Holbein Rooms. However, only the Queen's Private Chapel and several modern rooms were to be restored in a modern style.

Designs were submitted to a Restoration Committee, whose chairman was Prince Philip, Duke of Edinburgh and deputy chairman was Charles, Prince of Wales. Members included the David Ogilvy, 13th Earl of Airlie (Lord Chamberlain), Sir Hayden Phillips (Permanent Secretary of the Department of National Heritage), Norman St John-Stevas, Lord St John of Fawsley (Chairman of the Royal Fine Art Commission), Sir Jocelyn Stevens (Chairman of English Heritage), Frank Duffy (President of the Royal Institute of British Architects) and three senior palace officials.

The fire, catastrophic though it was, presented the opportunity for some major new architectural work. Although criticised by some people who thought it lacked imagination, the architects believed that, given the history of the building and the surviving fabric, the new work had to be Gothic.

Execution

The state dining room gilded sideboard, 19 feet long and made out of rare rosewood and oak, was originally designed by Augustus Pugin in the 19th century. It had to be replicated by N.E.J. Stevenson using only some photographs and descriptions.

New designs for St George's Hall and the Queen's Private Chapel were approved by the Queen on 24 January 1995. Designed by architect Giles Downes, the new roof for St George's Hall is an example of a hammer-beam ceiling. The new chapel and adjoining cloisters were realigned to form a processional route from the private apartments, through an octagonal vestibule, into St George's Hall. Downes's new roof is the largest green-oak structure built since the Middle Ages and is decorated with brightly coloured shields celebrating the heraldic element of the Order of the Garter; the design attempts to create an illusion of additional height through the Gothic woodwork along the ceiling. Commentators have noted that Downes's work does much to compensate for the originally flawed dimensions of the hall. The Lantern Lobby has oak columns forming a vaulted ceiling, imitating an arum lily.

The first stage of the structural restoration was completed in May 1996. Fitting out, originally planned to finish by spring 1998, occurred on 17 November 1997. The Queen held a reception in the newly restored hall for the architects and building contractors involved in the project.

References

External links
 A day that shook the world: Windsor Castle fire (2010) at The Independent

Building and structure fires in England
Disasters in Berkshire
1992 Fires
1992 disasters in the United Kingdom
1992 in England
1992 fires in the United Kingdom
1990s in Berkshire
November 1992 events in the United Kingdom
Residential building fires
Events involving British royalty
Rebuilt buildings and structures in the United Kingdom